The Taman Formation is a geologic formation in Mexico. It preserves fossils dating back to the Jurassic period. It was deposited in a "oxic to anoxic (or anoxic-hypersaline), shallow marine environment" The lithology predominantly consists of limestone and shale.

See also

 List of fossiliferous stratigraphic units in Mexico

References

 

Jurassic Mexico
Jurassic System of North America
Kimmeridgian Stage